Sarasanapalli  is a village in Regidi Amadalavalasa mandal of Srikakulam district, Andhra Pradesh, India.

Sarasanapalli Panchayat

Panchayat Presidents

Villages in Srikakulam district